Race Street is a major east-west street in Philadelphia, Pennsylvania that runs parallel to Cherry Street. It was one of William Penn's original gridded streets from the 1680s, although named Sassafras Street then. It is listed by name on the map in Birch's Views of Philadelphia (1800) – Race and Arch Streets are listed by their original names, "Sassafras" and "Mulberry." The earliest official use of the name Cherry Street was in 1809.

History
The name "Race Street" was originally a nickname given to the street, as the street was used for horse racing in the early 1800s.  The name became official some time in the mid 1850s.

Points of interest

Center City
From east in Center City (near the Delaware River) to west (near the Schuylkill River):

Elfreth's Alley
National Constitution Center
Franklin Square
Philadelphia Police Department Headquarters
Chinatown, Philadelphia
Pennsylvania Convention Center
Pennsylvania Academy of the Fine Arts
Race Street Friends Meetinghouse
Friends Select School
Cathedral Basilica of Saints Peter and Paul
Embassy Suites by Hilton
Franklin Institute

West Philadelphia
Drexel University Campus, from 32nd to 34th Streets:
 Steinbright Career Development Center
 Design Arts Annex
 North Hall
 Tower Hall
 Race Street Hall (rear)
 Calhoun Hall (rear)

See also
 History of Philadelphia

References

Streets in Philadelphia
Economy of Philadelphia